Bhakta Kanakadasa is a 1960 Indian Kannada language film, directed by Y. R. Swamy. It depicts the spiritual journey of Kanakadasa, who was a devotee of the Hindu deity Krishna, and a poet belonging to the Dasa sect. The film stars Rajkumar, Krishna Kumari and Udaykumar in the major roles. This film, officially marked the 100th production/release of Kannada cinema, since its inception in 1934.

Boasting of lilting tunes including the works of Kanakadasa himself, the songs were held in high esteem. The music was composed by M. Venkataraju, the songs turned very popular. Edited by Govinda Swamy & M.S. Parthasarathy

Story line
Kanaka, who is the chieftain of a fort wishes to marry a lass, played by Krishna Kumari, much to the chagrin of his opponent, Uday Kumar. In a riveting battle scene, Kanaka is on the verge of losing, while Lord Krishna appears and asks him to surrender himself to divine grace. Man of high temper, Kanaka refuses and continues fighting.

As fate would have it, Kanaka is mortally wounded and healed by Lord Krishna. Surrendering himself to the divinity, Kanaka becomes a dasa [servant] to the Lord. With his unflinching devotion and dedication, he gets the trust of Sri Vyasatirtha, the Royal Priest of Vijayanagar. Inspired by Sri Vyasatirtha to visit the historic Udupi Sri Krishna Temple, Kanaka reaches there, only to be denied entry.

Kanaka is charged with defying law and is punished. His eyes are about to be gouged, but a miracle happens. Lord Krishna's idol turns around, breaks opens the wall and offers Darshan to Kanaka. This supposedly led to the formation of Kanakana kindi.

Kanaka is accepted as a true Saint by the society and spends his life singing praise of the Lord and composing poems on the Lord, including "Mohana Tarangini" and "Rama Dhyaana Charitre".

Soundtrack

Awards
National Film Awards
 1960: Certificate of Merit for Best Feature Film in Kannada

References

External links

1960 films
1960s Kannada-language films
Indian biographical films
Films scored by M. Venkataraju
1960s biographical films
Films directed by Y. R. Swamy